Danco Laboratories is a pharmaceutical distributor located in midtown Manhattan which distributes the abortifacent drug mifepristone under the brand name Mifeprex. Mifeprex is the only drug distributed by Danco, although the company plans to expand to other drugs in the future.

Danco is a private company that does not disclose the names of its investors, but stated that "[Investors] included wealthy individuals and foundations that supported abortion rights." In April 2018, Danco Laboratories got approval to market Mifeprex in the U.S. as the abortion drug.

References

1995 establishments in New York (state)
Companies based in New York City
American companies established in 1995
Pharmaceutical companies established in 1995
Pharmaceutical companies of the United States
Health care companies based in New York (state)